Bibby  is a surname. Notable people with the surname include: 

 Andrew Bibby (born 1980), Australian actor
 Bob Bibby (1925–1994), Australian football player
 Chloe Bibby (born 1998), Australian basketball player
 Colin Bibby (1948-2004), British ornithologist
 Cyril Bibby (1914-1987), British biologist, educator and early sexologist
 Dan Bibby (born 1991), English rugby player
 Edwin Bibby (1848–1905), English wrestler, first American heavyweight champion
 Enid Bibby (born 1951), British educator
 Geoffrey Bibby (1917-2001), Danish archaeologist
 Henry Bibby (born 1949), American basketball player, brother of Jim and father of Mike
 Hugh Bibby (born 1943), New Zealand geophysicist
 Ian Bibby (born 1986), British racing cyclist
 Jessica Bibby (born 1979), Australian basketball player
 Jim Bibby (1944–2010), American baseball player
 John Bibby (businessman) (1775–1840), founder of the British Bibby Line shipping company
 John Roland Bibby (1917–1997), British scholar, poet, writer, historian and antiquarian
 John S. Bibby (born 1935), British geologist
 Mike Bibby (born 1978), American basketball player
 Neil Bibby (born 1983), Scottish politician
 Reginald Bibby, Canadian sociologist
 Thomas Bibby (1799–1863), Irish poet
 three Bibby baronets